ZST is a mixed martial arts organization.

ZST may also refer to:
 Stewart Aerodrome (IATA: ZST), British Columbia, Canada
 .zst, the filename extension for Zstandard (zstd) compressed files
 .zst, the save file extension for the ZSNES video game console emulator
 MG ZST, an automobile
 ZST, the car plate district indicator for Stargard County, Poland
 ZST, a Canadian exchange-traded fund
 Zst, the mineral symbol for zincostaurolite